Loretta Butler-Turner is a Bahamian mortician and politician. She was the Leader of the Opposition in the Bahamian Parliament from December 2016 to May 2017.

Early life

Loretta Butler-Turner was born in Nassau, Bahamas to Rose Marie (née Taylor) and Raleigh Butler, who was the son of the first Bahamian Governor-General, Sir Milo Butler. 

She attended primary and secondary school at St. Andrews School in Nassau and was the first Bahamian female to earn a Bachelor of Science degree in mortuary sciences, graduating summa cum laude from the New England Institute of Mortuary Science.

Mortuary career

Butler became an embalmer and mortuary director in her father's business, Butlers’ Funeral Homes and Crematorium of Nassau. She has provided services for several notable deaths, particularly for singer Aaliyah and tv personality Daniel Wayne Smith (son of Anna Nicole Smith).

Political career

In 2007, she was elected to parliament for the Montagu Constituency as a member of the Free National Movement (FNM) party and  appointed Minister of State for Social Development.

Inter-American Commission of Women

Butler served as Vice President of the Inter-American Commission of Women from 2009 to 2011, completing the term of Jeanette Carrillo Madrigal of Costa Rica who had resigned.

Deputy Leader

In 2012, Butler-Taylor ran for the Long Island seat  and was elected. 
That same year, she was chosen as the Deputy Leader of the Free National Movement. 

Butler ran for the party leadership in 2014 but was defeated by Hubert Minnis.  (Peter Turnquest replaced her as Deputy Leader.) 

Finally, in December 2016, Butler-Turner was sworn in as the first woman Opposition Leader in the Bahamas history. Four days later, Butler came under fire from her predecessor, Hubert Minnis, who vowed to have her leadership rescinded.

Ouster from Party

In April 2017, she was thrown out of the party and ran as an independent in the general election the following month. She received less than 300 votes, thus ending her parliamentary career.

References

Living people
Funeral directors
People from Nassau, Bahamas
Free National Movement politicians
21st-century Bahamian women politicians
21st-century Bahamian politicians
Members of the House of Assembly of the Bahamas
Year of birth missing (living people)
Politicians affected by a party expulsion process
Women opposition leaders